In the theory of stochastic processes in mathematics and statistics, the generated filtration or natural filtration  associated to a stochastic process is a filtration associated to the process which records its "past behaviour" at each time. It is in a sense the simplest filtration available for studying the given process: all information concerning the process, and only that information, is available in the natural filtration.

More formally, let (Ω, F, P) be a probability space; let (I, ≤) be a totally ordered index set; let (S, Σ) be a measurable space; let X : I × Ω → S be a stochastic process. Then the natural filtration of F with respect to X is defined to be the filtration F•X = (FiX)i∈I given by

i.e., the smallest σ-algebra on Ω that contains all pre-images of Σ-measurable subsets of S for "times" j up to i.

In many examples, the index set I is the natural numbers N (possibly including 0) or an interval [0, T] or [0, +∞); the state space S is often the real line R or Euclidean space Rn.

Any stochastic process X is an adapted process with respect to its natural filtration.

References

See also
 Filtration (mathematics)

Stochastic processes